Friedrich (Fritz) Wilhelm Ludwig Kränzlin (25 July 1847 – 9 March 1934) was a botanist associated with the Natural History Museum (BM).

In the history of the European study of South African orchids, Fritz Kränzlin appears after Heinrich Gustav Reichenbach describing many new orchids in the region, and revising some of the genera. His book Orchidacearum Genera et Species was never finished, but the volume containing the Habenaria, Disa, and Disperis genus was completed in 1901.

Publications
Reichenbach, H. G. & Kraenzlin, W. L.: Xenia Orchidacea. Beiträge zur Kenntniss der Orchideen

See also 

 Taxa named by Friedrich Ludwig Kraenzlin

References

External links

1847 births
1934 deaths
19th-century German botanists
20th-century German botanists